The Kiev Tumbler (Kyivskyi svitlyi) is a breed of fancy pigeon.

Yellow Kiev Tumbler

Origin: Kyiv (Kiev), capital city of Ukraine.

Breeders of this breed can be found in Ukraine, Russia, Slovakia and most recently, Portugal.  There are 1 or 2 breeders in France, but they have the show type of this breed and not the flying type (the original), the one that should tumble.

Black Kiev Tumbler

Description: A flying breed that flies at a medium height and it should make 'tumbles'.  It is long-faced, with a long beak.  It is a slender, gentle pigeon.  Size: Small, a little smaller than a normal homing pigeon (racing pigeon); weight from 210 to 250 grams.

Ornaments: Have a peak-crested and small-muffed legs.  Its wings are carried upon the tail, which has a minimum of 12 rectrices and an oil duct.

Red Kiev Tumbler

Colors: The feathers of the head, breast, neck and feet are white; Including a frontal spot on the forehead, which should be of the same color as the rest of the body.  Its eye is bull, with flesh-colored eye cere.

They are found in colors of Red, Yellow, Black, Blue Bar and other colors but the pigeon must always have 
the same color markings on the body.

External links 
 Photographs of Kiev Tumblers

See also
List of pigeon breeds

Pigeon breeds
Pigeon breeds originating in Ukraine